Josiah McConnell Heyman (born 1958) is an American anthropologist and professor of anthropology at the University of Texas at El Paso, where he is also an Endowed Professor of Border Trade Issues and the director of the Center for Interamerican and Border Studies. He is known for his studies of the United States-Mexico border, which he has been studying for over 30 years. He has also researched the increasing extent to which the border has been enforced by the United States Border Patrol.

References

External links
Faculty page

1958 births
Living people
American anthropologists
University of Texas at El Paso faculty
City University of New York alumni